Malaria is a mosquito-borne infectious disease that affects humans and other animals.

Malaria may also refer to:

 Malaria (1919 film), a German silent film
 Malaria (1943 film), a French drama film
 Malaria (2016 film), an Iranian drama film
 Malaria!, an experimental electronic band from West Berlin